Diana Leo Gandega (born 2 June 1983 in Paris) is a French-Malian women's basketball player. Gandega competed for Mali at the 2008 Summer Olympics, where she scored 15 points in 5 games, including 8 points in the first match, a 4-point loss to New Zealand. Her younger sister Touty Gandega is also a basketball player.

References

1983 births
Living people
French women's basketball players
Malian women's basketball players
Olympic basketball players of Mali
Basketball players at the 2008 Summer Olympics
Basketball players from Paris
French sportspeople of Malian descent
African Games gold medalists for Mali
African Games medalists in basketball
Competitors at the 2015 African Games